Hurricane Ginny was the strongest recorded tropical cyclone to make landfall in Canada, as well as the latest hurricane on a calendar year to affect the U.S. state of Maine. The eighth tropical storm, as well as the seventh and final hurricane of the 1963 Atlantic hurricane season, Ginny developed on October 16 over the Bahamas, although it was not initially a fully tropical cyclone. As it moved to the North and later northwest, Ginny intensified to hurricane status as it became more tropical. For eight days, it was located within  of the United States coastline. After approaching North Carolina, Ginny looped to the southwest and approached within  of the Florida coastline. It turned to the North, to the East, and later to the northeast, strengthening late in its duration to peak winds of 110 mph (175 km/h). Ginny became an extratropical cyclone shortly after striking Nova Scotia at its peak intensity on October 29.

Although it remained close to the United States coastline, its impact was minor. Beach erosion and light rainfall was reported along much of the coastline, although the precipitation was beneficial in ending droughts in South Carolina and New England. High waves destroyed one house in North Carolina. Damage was heaviest in New England, where several buildings were damaged and thousands were left without power. The passage of Ginny resulted in a snow storm across eastern New England, particularly in northern Maine, where it killed two people. In Atlantic Canada, the extratropical storm produced high wind and waves, causing damage to boats and resulting in power outages.

Meteorological history

The origins of Hurricane Ginny were from a trough that extended from the Bahamas to Bermuda in the middle of October. On October 16, a depression formed near the Turks and Caicos islands after a tropical wave interacted with the trough, although initially it was not tropical in nature due to the widespread presence of cold air. The system initially moved generally northward, attaining gale–force winds on October 19 as it turned to the northwest. It closely approached the North Carolina coastline, passing 135 mi (220 km) southeast of Cape Lookout before turning abruptly to the northeast. It executed a small loop and began a steady motion to the southeast while located over the Gulf Stream. This motion was due to a large ridge located over New England. On October 21, the hurricane became better organized and began transitioning into a tropical cyclone. By early on October 22, Hurricane Hunters indicated that Ginny completed the transition into a fully tropical cyclone, observing an eye 20 mi (32 km) in diameter.

On October 23, Ginny briefly weakened to tropical storm status as it was moving toward Florida, although within 10 hours it regained hurricane intensity. Its motion to the southwest was unusual but not unique, and resembled the tracks of the 1935 Yankee hurricane and Hurricane Able in 1951. On October 24, it turned sharply northeastward off the northeast Florida coast, coming within  of Daytona Beach. The hurricane continued paralleling the coast of the Southeastern United States, turning northeast away from Georgia and South Carolina. On October 26, Ginny turned to the east away from the United States, having been located within  of the country's coast for eight consecutive days. The next day, the hurricane began a motion to the northeast, accelerating in advance of an approaching trough. It gradually intensified, reaching peak winds of 110 mph (175 km/h) on October 29. Later that day, Ginny made landfall near Yarmouth, Nova Scotia while only weakening slightly with sustained winds of 105 mph (165 km/h), making it the strongest tropical cyclone known to have made landfall in Canada. Ginny became extratropical shortly thereafter, and its remnants dissipated on October 30 in the Gulf of Saint Lawrence.

Impact

Early in its duration, the precursor to Ginny dropped high amounts of rainfall. Monción in the Dominican Republic reported , and Green Turtle Cay in the Bahamas reported .

Despite Ginny's proximity to the United States for over a week, a hurricane warning was only issued from Charleston, South Carolina, and Cape Fear, North Carolina, as well as Cape Hatteras. This represented about one-sixth of the entire coastline that was threatened by the storm. Further north, minor damage and beach erosion was likewise reported in Georgia. Along the South Carolina coast, Ginny dropped beneficial rainfall, which alleviated the state's worst drought conditions on record.

The hurricane approached North Carolina twice. During the second time, residents in low-lying areas and along the coast evacuated. These were the highest winds related to the hurricane, although they may have been overestimated. In addition, the heaviest rainfall related to the storm occurred near Southport, where  of precipitation fell. In Virginia, the hurricane caused minor flooding and minimal beach erosion. During Ginny's first approach through the region, it produced gale-force winds along the Virginia coast, although it did not do so during its second approach.

Later, a gale warning was issued for New England due to Ginny's threat, as well as a hurricane watch for Long Island and southern New England. However, a boat offshore Portland, Maine reported  seas and winds of at least . The rainfall was beneficial across the region, ending a 28-day drought. Along Cape Cod and in Maine, high winds from the storm downed several trees, some of which fell onto power lines. About 1,000 homes in Chatham, Massachusetts lost power. In Nantucket, high waves caused additional erosion in an area affected by Hurricane Esther two years prior. Damage was heavier in Maine, where many boats were damaged or broke from their moorings. One person died from a heart attack while trying to rescue his boat. Several small buildings in the state were destroyed, and the post office in Calais, Maine lost its roof. Ginny was the latest hurricane on record to affect Maine. During its passage, Ginny brought an influx of cold air over New England that produced the first snowfall of the season across Massachusetts, Maine, and New Hampshire. In most locations, the snow quickly melted, although higher totals occurred in northern Maine, the highest being  on Mount Katahdin. The snow killed a mountain climber and a park ranger. Damage from Ginny in the United States was estimated at $400,000.

As the remnants of Ginny moved across Atlantic Canada, they produced heavy rainfall, peaking at 4.53 in (113 mm) in southern New Brunswick. Winds peaked at 99 mph (160 km/h) in Greenwood, Nova Scotia. The winds blew down trees in the Halifax area, and there were power outages reported there and in Antigonish. High waves broke boats from their moorings, causing them to either wash ashore or float out to sea. Ferry service across the region was canceled. In neighboring New Brunswick, the storm caused outages to telephone and electric services. Several injuries were reported, although there were no fatalities. The entirety of Prince Edward Island was also left without power.

See also

List of New England hurricanes

References

1963 Atlantic hurricane season
Category 2 Atlantic hurricanes
Hurricanes in North Carolina
Hurricanes in Canada
Hurricanes in the Bahamas
Hurricanes in New England
1963 in Canada
1963 natural disasters in the United States